Sphaerocypraea is a small family of large sea snails, marine gastropod molluscs in the family Eocypraeidae, belonging to the cowries and cowry allies.

Species
 † Sphaerocypraea bowerbankii (Sowerby in Dixon, 1850) †
 Sphaerocypraea incomparabilis (Briano, 1993)
 † Sphaerocypraea levesquei (Deshayes, 1835)

References

 Briano, B. (1993). Descrizione di un nuovo Genere e una nuova specie di Cypraeidae dalla Somalia. World Shells. 5: 14-17. Pediculariidae and Eocypraeidae|publisher = ConchBooks|location= Hackenheim|year = 2009|pages = 650 pp}}

External links
 Schilder, F. A. (1927). Revision der Cypraeacea (Moll. Gastr.). Archiv für Naturgeschichte. 91A(10): 1-171
 Fehse, D. (2021). The systematic position of the Eocypraeidae F.A. Schilder 1924 Part 2 (Mollusca: Gastropoda: Cypraeoidea). Privately published, Dirk Fehse, Berlin. 1-46

Eocypraeidae